Daniel Bigelow Blake, Jr. (May 22, 1882 – September 7, 1953) was an American football player and coach.

Early years
Dan Bigelow Blake, Jr. was born on May 22, 1882 in Cuero, Texas to Daniel Bigelow Blake, Sr. and Mary Clara Weldon. Dan, Sr. was a physician and once president of the Nashville Academy of Medicine.

Playing years

Vanderbilt
Blake was a prominent halfback and end for Dan McGugin's Vanderbilt football teams from 1903 to 1906, winning multiple SIAA titles. His two brothers, Bob and Vaughn, also played on those teams. Dan, Bob, and Vaughn were captains of the 1906, 1907, and 1908 Vanderbilt teams respectively. Dan Blake was selected consensus All-Southern in 1906. At Vanderbilt he was a member of the Kappa Sigma fraternity and stood 5 feet 11 and weighed some 165 pounds.

1903
Dan played end in 1903, the same position as his brother Bob.

1904

One writer in 1904 still contended Blake, who "played left half for Vanderbilt, '04, being taken from left end, which position he played in '03. End is his position; he is heavy, weighing about 170, is fast, a good tackler, advances the ball well, and is a fair punter."

1906
Dan was captain of the 1906 team, considered one of the school's greatest. Dan made the field goal to tie Michigan 4 to 4, a score that would remain until the final two minutes saw a Michigan touchdown.

Coaching years

Hopkinsville High
He went on to coach at Hopkinsville High School at Hopkinsville, Kentucky. While there he was manager of the electric light and gas plants of the Kentucky Public Service Company.

See also
Story about Blake and Vandy's "canine mascot"

References

American football halfbacks
1882 births
1953 deaths
Vanderbilt Commodores football players
People from Cuero, Texas
Players of American football from Texas
All-Southern college football players
High school football coaches in Kentucky